German submarine U-795 was a Type XVIIA U-boat of Nazi Germany's Kriegsmarine during World War II.

U-795 was laid down on 2 February 1943 at the Friedrich Krupp Germaniawerft shipyard at Kiel. Commissioned on 21 March 1944, the U-boat was commissioned on 22 April 1944 under the command of Oberleutnant zur See Horst Selle. She served with 8th U-boat Flotilla until 15 February as a training boat, and then with 5th U-boat Flotilla until 3 May 1945.

On 3 May 1945, while in dry dock at Kiel, the engine room was destroyed with explosives to prevent its usefulness to the enemy if captured.

References

Bibliography

External links
 

German Type XVII submarines
1943 ships
U-boats commissioned in 1944
World War II submarines of Germany
Ships built in Kiel
Operation Regenbogen (U-boat)
Maritime incidents in May 1945